The 2000 Junior Oceania Cup was an international field hockey tournament hosted by Australia. The quadrennial tournament serves as the Junior Championship of Oceania, organized by the Oceania Hockey Federation. It was held in Canberra, Australia, between 30 March and 2 April 2000.

Australia won the tournament, finishing the pool stage with two wins and one draw. The win guaranteed the team qualification to the 2001 FIH Junior World Cup in Buenos Aires.

Results
All times are local (AEDT).

Pool

Fixtures

References

External links
Hockey Australia
Hockey New Zealand

Junior Oceania Cup
International field hockey competitions hosted by Australia
Sports competitions in Canberra
Junior Oceania Cup
2000s in Canberra
Oceania Cup
Junior Oceania Cup
Junior Oceania Cup